Kierre Kamille Beckles (born 21 May 1990) is a Barbadian athlete specializing in the 100 metres hurdles. She competed at the 2011 and 2013 World Championships failing to advance to the semi-finals on both occasions.

Personal bests
Her personal bests of 13.01 (100 m hurdles) from 2011 and 8.11 (60 m hurdles) from 2012 are the current Barbadian records.

Competition record

1: Did not finish in the final,

References

External links

1990 births
Living people
Barbadian female hurdlers
Commonwealth Games competitors for Barbados
Athletes (track and field) at the 2014 Commonwealth Games
Athletes (track and field) at the 2018 Commonwealth Games
Pan American Games competitors for Barbados
Athletes (track and field) at the 2015 Pan American Games
World Athletics Championships athletes for Barbados
Sportspeople from Bridgetown
Athletes (track and field) at the 2016 Summer Olympics
Olympic athletes of Barbados
Central American and Caribbean Games bronze medalists for Barbados
Competitors at the 2014 Central American and Caribbean Games
Competitors at the 2018 Central American and Caribbean Games
Central American and Caribbean Games medalists in athletics